Jean Bart was a merchant vessel built at Bayonne in 1786. Her owners commissioned her at Nantes in 1793 as a privateer. The Navy intended to rename her Imposant in May 1795, but the Royal Navy captured her first.

On 15 April 1795, a naval squadron under Sir John Borlase Warren gave chase to Jean Bart, described in the report of the capture as being a ship-corvette of 26 guns and 187 men.

The Royal Navy took Jean Bart into service as the post ship HMS Laurel. Between July and 8 December 1795 the Royal Navy had Laurel fitted a Portsmouth. She had been flush-decked, but received a small forecastle, quarterdeck, and extra platforms. She was commissioned under Captain Robert Rolles. He had been promoted to post captain on 12 August 1785; he had been captain of the hired armed ship .

Rolles sailed Laurel for the coast of Africa and then the Leeward Islands. In May 1796 Laurel participated in the capture of Saint Lucia under Rear Admiral SirHugh Cloberry Christian and General Ralph Abercrombie, and shared in the prize money for the capture.

Laurel was sold in 1797 at Jamaica.

Citations and references
Citations

References

Schomberg, Isaac (1802) Naval Chronology, Or an Historical Summary of Naval and Maritime Events from the Time of the Romans, to the Treaty of Peace 1802: With an Appendix, Volume 4. (London: T. Egerton).

 

Ships built in France
1786 ships
Privateer ships of France
Corvettes of the French Navy
Post ships of the Royal Navy
Captured ships